The Yangon Ear, Nose and Throat Hospital is a public specialist hospital located in Yangon, Myanmar. The Yangon ENT Hospital was called the Yangon Eye, Ear, Nose and Throat (EENT) Hospital on Alanpya Road. It was moved to the current location in 2000.

See also
 List of hospitals in Yangon

References

Hospital buildings completed in 2000
Hospitals in Yangon